Sebastián Rodrigo Gaitán Araújo (born June 21, 1987 in Montevideo) is a Uruguayan footballer who plays as an attacking midfielder.

External links
 Profile at soccerway
 Profile at ceroacero

1987 births
Living people
Footballers from Montevideo
Uruguayan footballers
Association football midfielders
C.A. Progreso players
El Tanque Sisley players
Deportivo Petapa players
Villa Teresa players
Uruguayan Primera División players
Uruguayan Segunda División players
Liga Nacional de Fútbol de Guatemala players
Uruguayan expatriate footballers
Uruguayan expatriate sportspeople in Guatemala
Expatriate footballers in Guatemala